Martin Hotel, also known as the Morgan Co. Historical Museum, is a historic hotel building located at Versailles, Morgan County, Missouri. The original two-story frame section was built in 1877, with a two-story brick section added in 1884.  The buildings form a modified "U"-plan.  The building has housed the Morgan Co. Historical Museum since 1967.

It was listed on the National Register of Historic Places in 1978.

References

History museums in Missouri
Hotel buildings on the National Register of Historic Places in Missouri
Hotel buildings completed in 1877
Buildings and structures in Morgan County, Missouri
National Register of Historic Places in Morgan County, Missouri
1877 establishments in Missouri